Çolak is a Turkish surname. Notable people with the surname include:

 Adnan Çolak, Turkish serial killer
 Emre Çolak, Turkish footballer
 Halil Çolak, Turkish-Dutch footballer
 Selahattin Çolak, Turkish politician
 Tanju Çolak, Turkish footballer
 Lejla Çolak, Turkish journalist

Turkish-language surnames